The National Agency for National Parks (French: Agence Nationale des Parcs Nationaux) is the authority in Gabon charged with overseeing the national park system and with protecting their resources and wildlife. The agency coordinate research activities, license concessionaires, promote tourism and have police powers.

History
On 30 August 2002, the President Omar Bongo created 13 national parks containing , almost 11% of the total land area of the country. In addition, these parks include  of marine territory. The National Council for National Parks (CNPN) was an interdepartmental body created to establish the National Parks. In 2007 the National Agency for National Parks was established by the laws adopted as the legal framework of the park system.

See also
 List of national parks of Gabon

References

External links
National Agency for National Parks official website

Environment and heritage law enforcement agencies
National park administrators
National parks of Gabon